Khar-Us Lake ("Black-Aqua Lake") is a lake  in western Mongolia in the Great Lakes Depression. It is the upper one in a system of the interconnected lakes: Khar-Us, Khar, Dörgön, Airag and Khyargas.  The lake is located in Har Us Nuur National Park.

Its area value (1,852 km2) includes the island Agbash (or Ak-Bashi, white head) area (274 km2), so the water surface area is 1,578 km2 only.

Some sources are using different Khar-Us Lake Lake statistics values: 
Water level: 1,160.08 m
Surface area: 1,496.6 km2
Average depth: 2.1 m
Volume: 3.12 km³.

Primary inflow is the Khovd River, which creates a large river delta.

So called Genghis Khan's wall runs along the western shore of the Khar-Us Lake. It is possible to find it at the Google Map and Google Earth satellite maps .

References 

Lakes of Mongolia
Ramsar sites in Mongolia